Papaver alpinum, the Alpine poppy or dwarf poppy, is a poppy found in the Alps.
This species includes several sub-species, four of which are found in Austria.

Description
A short, upright, hairy perennial with leaves one to two odd pinnate. Grows to a height of 5 to 20 cm, with several upright and hairy stems.  As with all poppy species, a latex is produced. The feathery leaves are arranged in a ground hugging rosette.

The flowers are hermaphroditic and are radially symmetric with a diameter of up to 5 cm. The fragrant flowers do not have nectar, but produce pollen. The flowering period is from July to August.

All alpine poppy sub-species have a strong taproot and make a good rockery plant. To help secure the plant, the root hairs are angled upwards.

Subspecies

Rhaetian Alps poppy (P. alpinum subsp. rhaeticum) has light yellow to orange petals and feathery foliage is found in the Central and Southern Alps. In Austria, it is scattered around Carinthia, Styria and Salzburg, in Switzerland allegedly only in the Engadin.

Salzburg Alpine poppy (P. alpinum subsp. sendtneri) also has pinnate deciduous leaves, with white flowers with a yellow heart. This grows only in the northern Alps and Northern Limestone Alps. It is found in moving  limestone rubble, boulders, lime rock, or dolomite.  It prefers a high altitude of 1300m to 2600m. Although the protected plant is rare, it is the most commonly found white flowering alpine poppy. In Austria it is found in Tyrol, Vorarlberg, Upper Austria, Salzburg and Styria.

Kerner-Alpine poppy (P. alpinum subsp. kerneri), or Karawanken Alpine poppy, has two to three times pinnate deciduous leaves and bright yellow flowers. It is found in the south-eastern Limestone Alps, with a main distribution in the Slovenian Alps. In Austria it is only found in the southern Carinthia.

North-east Alpine poppy (P. alpinum subsp. alpinum; syn. P. burseri Crantz), or Burser-Alpine poppy, has two to three times pinnate deciduous leaves with white flowers and is found in the north eastern Limestone Alps. In Austria it is found in Lower Austria, Upper Austria and Styria.

Other subspecies, P. alpinum ssp ernesti-mayeri is white; P. alpinum subsp. dubium is bright red; P. alpinum subsp. corona-sancti-stephani (Zapal.); P. alpinum subsp. degenii (Urum. & Jáv.), found in Bulgaria and considered a full species by some authors.

Chemistry 
The alkaloids amurensine and amurensinine can be found in P. alpinum.

References

Sources
 Xaver Finkenzeller:Alpine flowers, Munich 2003, 
 Fischer, MA, Adler, W. & K. Oswald:Excursion flora for Austria, Liechtenstein and South Tyrol,Linz, 2005, 
 Bittkau C, Kadereit JW. 2002. Phylogenetic and geographical relationships in Papaver alpinum L. (Papaveraceae) based on RAPD data. Botanische Jahrbücher für Systematik, Pflanzengeschichte und Pflanzengeographie 123: 463–479.

alpinum
Flora of the Alps
Flora of Austria
Flora of Switzerland
Alpine flora
~
Plants described in 1753
Taxa named by Carl Linnaeus